Cirencester was a parliamentary constituency in Gloucestershire. From 1571 until 1885, it was a parliamentary borough, which returned two Member of Parliament (MPs) to the House of Commons of the Parliament of the United Kingdom until 1868, and one member between 1868 and 1885. In 1885 the borough was abolished but the name was transferred to the county constituency in which it stood; this constituency was abolished for the 1918 general election.

History
The town sent Members to Parliament on at least one occasion during the 14th century and again in 1547. Cirencester borough as established in 1571 consisted of part of the parish of Cirencester, a market town in the east of Gloucestershire. In 1831, the population of the borough was 4,420, and the town contained 917 houses.

The right to vote was exercised by all resident householders of the borough who were not receiving alms, an unusually liberal franchise for the period in any but the smallest towns, which meant that there were about 500 qualified voters. This arose from the chance that a dispute over the franchise arose in 1624, and the House of Commons had to decide whether only the freeholders could vote or if the right should extend to all the householders. The 1620s was a rare period when the Commons as a matter of policy tended to decide for the broadest interpretation in franchise disputes (all 15 cases brought before them in that decade were resolved in favour of the solution which enfranchised most voters), and consequently in Cirencester the householders acquired the right of which they were never subsequently deprived (and which was later confirmed at another disputed election in 1724). Another election petition, in 1709, turned on whether the inhabitants of the Abbey, Emery and Sperringate Lane sections of the town were included within the borough; the Commons ruled that they were, but they were excluded again after yet another disputed election in 1792.

Despite Cirencester's relatively large electorate, the local landowners (or "patrons") were able to exert a very substantial influence over the elections, and it could probably be fairly described as a pocket borough. From at least the start of the 18th century, the Bathurst family were Lords of the Manor and had a share of the patronage, almost invariably filling one of the seats themselves and occasionally nominating the other MP as well. The Master family, whose influence predated that of the Bathursts, were able to command the second seat for long periods. In the 18th century, both the Bathursts and the Masters were Tories. Nevertheless, there were signs that the townspeople could show independence on occasion: in 1754, when the head of the Masters was a child and the Bathursts tried to take both seats, Cirencester shocked its Tory patrons by electing a local Whig nobleman instead.

The Reform Act 1832 extended the borough's boundaries slightly to include the whole of the parish, increasing the population to 5,420; but even with the revised franchise this gave Cirencester only 604 electors. The reform apparently did little to democratise the borough, for Bathursts and Masters continued to be elected almost continually throughout its existence. As subsequent Reform Acts raised the barrier for representation, Cirencester lost one of its two MPs in 1868 and had its boundaries further extended to take in the adjoining parish of Stratton; but, still too small, the borough was abolished altogether in 1885.

However, the name was transferred to the county constituency in which the town was placed, formally called The Eastern (or Cirencester) Division of Gloucestershire. This was a substantially-sized constituency fairly similar in its boundaries to the modern Cotswold District Council, with a strong rural element but including a number of small towns apart from Cirencester - Chipping Campden, Fairford, Moreton-in-Marsh, Tetbury and Stow-on-the-Wold among them. In character it proved more Liberal than Cirencester borough had done, though this may have been as much from the dilution of the Bathurst influence as from political factors - consequently instead of being a safe Conservative seat it was generally a knife-edge marginal. Arthur Winterbotham, the Liberal who had won the constituency by 700 votes at its first election, in 1885, was re-elected unopposed when he became a Liberal Unionist in 1886, but when he switched back to the Liberals at the next general election his majority fell to 153. Winterbotham died later the same year, and the by-election was decided in favour of the Conservative candidate, Colonel Thomas Chester-Master, by just 3 votes; but his defeated opponent petitioned against the result and after further scrutiny of the ballots the result was revised and declared to be tied. It was impossible at this stage to give a casting vote to the returning officer (the usual solution to a tied election at that period), so the election had to be run again.

The constituency was abolished in 1918, being split between the new Cirencester and Tewkesbury and Stroud constituencies.

Boundaries
1885–1918: The Sessional Divisions of Chipping Campden, Cirencester, Fairford, Moreton-in-Marsh, Northleach, Stow-on-the-Wold, and Tetbury.

Members of Parliament

MPs 1547

Borough constituency (1571–1885)

MPs 1571–1640

MPs 1640–1868

MPs 1868–1885

County constituency (1885–1918)

Elections

Elections in the 1830s

Caused by Henry Bathurst's succession to the Peerage, becoming 4th Earl Bathurst

Elections in the 1840s

Chester-Master resigned by accepting the office of Steward of the Chiltern Hundreds, causing a by-election

Cripps was appointed a Lord Commissioner of the Treasury, requiring a by-election.

Cripps' death caused a by-election.

Elections in the 1850s

Elections in the 1860s

 

 Seat reduced to one member

Elections in the 1870s

Bathurst succeeded to the peerage, becoming Earl Bathurst.

Elections in the 1880s

Elections in the 1890s

Chester-Master was originally declared the victor by 3 votes, but on petition and after scrutiny, the votes were declared equal and a new election was held.

Elections in the 1900s

Elections in the 1910s

References

Robert Beatson, A Chronological Register of Both Houses of Parliament (London: Longman, Hurst, Res & Orme, 1807) 
D Brunton & D H Pennington, Members of the Long Parliament (London: George Allen & Unwin, 1954)
 John Cannon, Parliamentary Reform 1640-1832 (Cambridge: Cambridge University Press, 1972)
Cobbett's Parliamentary history of England, from the Norman Conquest in 1066 to the year 1803 (London: Thomas Hansard, 1808) 
 F W S Craig, British Parliamentary Election Results 1832-1885 (2nd edition, Aldershot: Parliamentary Research Services, 1989)
 The Constitutional Year Book for 1913 (London: National Union of Conservative and Unionist Associations, 1913)
 Lewis Namier & John Brooke, The History of Parliament: The House of Commons 1754-1790 (London: HMSO, 1964)
 T. H. B. Oldfield The Representative History of Great Britain and Ireland (London: Baldwin, Cradock & Joy, 1816)
 J Holladay Philbin, Parliamentary Representation 1832 - England and Wales (New Haven: Yale University Press, 1965)
 Frederic A Youngs, jr, Guide to the Local Administrative Units of England, Vol I (London: Royal Historical Society, 1979)

External links
 An account of the Cirencester election of 1647

Politics of Gloucestershire
Parliamentary constituencies in South West England (historic)
Constituencies of the Parliament of the United Kingdom disestablished in 1918
1571 establishments in England